The Vaughan Flames was a professional women's ice hockey team in the Canadian Women's Hockey League (CWHL). The team played its home games at Vaughan Sports Village in Vaughan, Ontario, Canada.

History
In 1995 the Vaughan Flames joined the Ontario Women's Hockey Association (OWHA). Since 1995, the Vaughan Flames have grown to accommodate teams in all levels of play, including Senior. The club joined the National Women's Hockey League (NWHL) in 1999. The Team adopted different names:  Clearnet Lightning (1999 to 2001),  Telus Lightning  (2001 to 2006), Durham Lightning  (2005–2006) and  Etobicoke Dolphins  in 2006-07 (the last season of NWHL). In 2007 the Vaughan Flames joined the Canadian Women's Hockey League (CWHL). In 2010 it was announced that the CWHL would reduce the number of its teams to five. The Vaughan Flames team will no longer be playing in the CWHL, while the intermediates and other young level programs continue.

Season-by-season
in National Women's Hockey League (NWHL):

in Canadian Women's Hockey League (CWHL):

Note: GP = Games played, W = Wins, L = Losses, T = Ties, GF = Goals for, GA = Goals against, Pts = Points.

Season standings

Last roster (2009-10)

Coaching staff 2009-10
    General Manager: Barb Fisher and  Brandon Smith,
    Head Coach:  Bart Blair
    Assistant Coach: Gord Holdgate,
    Assistant Coach:  Eric Love,
    Assistant Coach: Amanda Reid,
    Equipment Manager: Lester Tiu,
    Head Therapist: Sharlton Hercules
    Trainer: Jackie  Raposo,

Notable former players
Kerry Weiland  USA National Team
She played with Vaughan Flames in season 2007-08.

Chloe Milano
York University
Rookie All Star Team - 2008/09

Jenn Wakefield Canada National Team
She played with Vaughan Flames in season 2009-10.

See also
 Canadian Women's Hockey League (CWHL)
 National Women's Hockey League (NWHL) was in service between 1998 and 2007.

References

External links
 Vaughan Flames Webpage
  Vaughan Flames 
 CWHL web site

Ice hockey teams in Ontario
Women's ice hockey teams in Canada
Defunct ice hockey teams in Canada
Canadian Women's Hockey League teams
Sport in Vaughan
Women in Ontario
2007 establishments in Ontario
2010 disestablishments in Ontario
Ice hockey clubs established in 2007
Ice hockey clubs disestablished in 2010